The Aero A.204 was a Czechoslovakian airliner that flew in prototype form in 1936. It was developed specifically for ČSA, but much to Aero's surprise and disappointment, the national airline selected a British product instead, the Airspeed Envoy. Unable to find a customer, Aero began to develop a military version instead, as the A.304.

Whilst Czechoslovakia was under occupation by Nazi Germany, Aero manufactured the Siebel Si 204 under licence. Similar in configuration to the A.204, these two aircraft are occasionally confused, but the correct Czech designation for the Siebel product is C-3.

Specifications

References

See also

A.204
1930s Czechoslovakian airliners
Aircraft first flown in 1936
Twin piston-engined tractor aircraft